Ning is the romanisation of the Chinese surnames 寧 Níng and its variant 甯 Nìng.  After the introduction of simplified characters, both names were written as 宁 in Mainland China until 2000, when the character 甯 was restored as an accepted variant for people whose family had originally used that character.  However, usage of 甯 remains rare, with most continuing to use 宁. 

As a first name, it is a name suitable for both genders, but more commonly masculine. Its literal meaning is "peaceful". The surname appears in the Hundred Family Surnames, but is relatively uncommon in modern times.  In 2008, research by the Chinese Office of Public Security estimated that around 710,000 people in China shared the surname 宁, making it the 173rd most common surname in the People's Republic of China.  Worldwide, the number of people with the surname Ning may be over 800,000.

Chinese 
The ancient origins of this surname are thought to begin with an official called Ji Wei in the era of the Zhou dynasty, who was given command over the county of Ningyi, which included the current regions of Huojia County and Xiuwu County in Henan. The descendants of Ji Wei adopted the geographical name of Ningyi as his surname in commemoration of his settlement.

The surname today appears in many areas of China, although there are a notable handful of towns in Guangxi which each have over 10,000 people surnamed Ning, specifically: Yandun, Taiping and Xinxu in Lingshan County, Xiaojian in Pubei County and Nalin in Bobai County.

Ninh (Vietnamese) 
The modern Vietnamese surname Ninh, derived from 寧 or 甯, has existed since at least the era of the Dinh dynasty, with historical mentions of a general called Ninh Huu Hung (939-1019), reputed to have overseen the construction of Hoa Lu, the ancient capital of Vietnam) and seen by Vietnamese as the father of carpentry and wood carving.

Notable people with the surname 宁/寧

Ning (Chinese)
宁安 Ning An, Chinese-American pianist
宁安 Ning An, Chinese professional footballer
宁滨 Ning Bin, politician in the PRC
寧程 Ning Cheng, government official of the Han Dynasty
宁春红 Ning Chunhong, Chess Woman Grandmaster
宁浩 Ning Hao, Chinese film director
宁静 Ning Jing, actress
宁露 Ning Lu, actress, producer
宁吉喆 Ning Jizhe, Chinese economist and statistician
宁梦华 Ning Menghua, Chinese olympic sprint canoeist
宁伟辰 Ning Weichen, Chinese professional footballer
宁瀛 Ning Ying, Chinese film director
宁宇清 Ning Yuqing, Chinese tennis player
宁泽涛 Ning Zetao, Olympic swimmer
宁珍云 Ning Zhenyun, member of China women's national football team at the 2004 Olympics
宁艺卓 Ning Yizhuo (stage name Ningning), member of South Korean girl group Aespa
??? James Ning, Chinese-American actor
甯董维 Ling Don Wei, Singaporean freelancer

Ninh (Vietnamese)
Ninh Cát Loan Châu, Vietnamese American singer
Ninh Dương Lan Ngọc, Vietnamese Actress

See also

Nina (name)
Niño (name)
Nino (name)

References

Chinese-language surnames
Individual Chinese surnames